Vasilsursk is an urban locality (a work settlement) in Vorotynsky District of Nizhny Novgorod Oblast, Russia, located on the Sura River, not far from its fall into the Volga.

History

A Kuruk Mari (a tribe of Mari people) wooden fortress named Tsepel used to stand where Vasilsursk is now located. Russians captured it after bloody fight in 1523 from Kuruk Maris and established on its site a small settlement. The fort here was used as an advanced base during the Russo-Kazan Wars.

Climate
Vasilsursk has a humid continental climate (Köppen climate classification Dfb) with long cold winters and warm, often hot dry summers. The warmest month is July with daily mean temperature near , the coldest month is January .

Population

Transportation

In warmer months, a ferry operates between Vasilsursk and the settlement of Lysaya Gora. During winter, passengers are transported by amphibious boats Khivus-10.

Sura Ionospheric Heating Facility

The Sura Ionospheric Heating Facility, an ionospheric research facility, is located near Vasilsursk.

References

Urban-type settlements in Nizhny Novgorod Oblast
Vorotynsky District
Vasilsursky Uyezd
Populated places established in 1523
1523 establishments in Europe
16th-century establishments in Russia